The Dickinson Estate Historic District encompasses the core holding of an early 20th century country estate in rural northern Brattleboro, Vermont. It includes a sophisticated Colonial Revival mansion house, built in 1900, and a variety of agricultural outbuildings dating to the same period. The estate, and in particular its barnyard complex, are well-preserved remnants of this era. The property is also notable for its association with Rudyard Kipling, who owned the estate for several years. It was listed on the National Register of Historic Places in 2005.

Description and history
The former Dickinson Estate is located in rural northern Brattleboro, near its border with Dummerston, on the west side of Kipling Road. In 1899 the Bliss Farm was purchased by Frederick and Harriet Dickinson; he was a prominent local businessman, she the daughter of a New York City millionaire. The farm became the core of a gentleman's farm country estate that reached  at its greatest extent. The Dickinsons built a 20-room Colonial Revival mansion house (to a design by Belgian architect Maurice Fornachon), and constructed a number of agricultural outbuildings to support farm operations on the property, demolishing most of the older buildings on the farm in the process. The only older building to survive on the property is an 1860s Greek Revival cottage, in which the Kiplings gave birth to their daughter while construction of nearby Naulakha was underway.

The central portion of the Dickinson estate was purchased in 1937 by Thomas Bibby, who continued to operate the farm. His widow remarried, to Henry Persons, a principal in the Experiment in International Living, now World Learning.

The property is historically significant as having one of the few surviving country estate houses left in Brattleboro, and for its remarkably well-preserved early-20th century farmyard, which was also designed by the architect Fornachon.  The elaborate and deliberate arrangement of the buildings in the farm complex is particularly unique in the state.

See also
National Register of Historic Places listings in Windham County, Vermont

References

External links
 

Historic districts on the National Register of Historic Places in Vermont
Greek Revival architecture in Vermont
Colonial Revival architecture in Vermont
Buildings and structures completed in 1900
Brattleboro, Vermont
National Register of Historic Places in Windham County, Vermont
Historic districts in Windham County, Vermont